The Bellona-class ships of the line were a class of five 74-gun third rates, whose design for the Royal Navy by Sir Thomas Slade was approved on 31 January 1758. Three ships were ordered on 28 December 1757, with names being assigned on 1 February 1758.

Design

Ships

Builder: Chatham Dockyard
Ordered: 28 December 1757.
Laid down: 10 May 1758.
Launched: 19 February 1760.
Completed: 6 April 1760.
Fate: Broken up at Chatham, September 1814.

Builder: Deptford Dockyard
Ordered: 28 December 1757.
Laid down: 28 March 1758.
Launched: 4 March 1760.
Completed: 19 April 1760.
Fate: Sold to be broken up, June 1784.

Builder: Deptford Dockyard
Ordered: 28 December 1757.
Laid down: 12 April 1758.
Launched: 27 October 1760.
Completed: 19 December 1760.
Fate: Wrecked at Bombay, 7 November 1783.

Builder: Deptford Dockyard
Ordered: 13 December 1758.
Laid down: 24 April 1759.
Launched: 26 March 1762.
Completed: 8 July 1762.
Fate: Sold to be broken up, August 1784.

Builder: Plymouth Dockyard
Ordered: 13 December 1758.
Laid down: 14 May 1759.
Launched: 31 March 1763.
Completed: 19 October 1770.
Fate: Wrecked off Jutland, 24 December 1811.

Notes

References

Lavery, Brian (2003) The Ship of the Line – Volume 1: The development of the battlefleet 1650–1850. Conway Maritime Press. .
Lavery, Brian (2003) The 74-gun ship Bellona. Conway Maritime Press. .
Winfield, Rif (2007) British Warships in the Age of Sail 1714–1792; Design, Construction, Careers and Fates. Seaforth Publishing. .

 
Ship of the line classes